The Namibian Ministry of Health and Social Services was established at Namibian independence in 1990. The first Namibian health and social services minister was Nickey Iyambo. The  minister is Kalumbi Shangula, former chief of medical services at the People's Liberation Army of Namibia (PLAN).

Ministers
All health and social services ministers in chronological order are:

References

External links
Official website Ministry of Health and Social Services

Health and social services
Health and social services
Health in Namibia
1990 establishments in Namibia